Cliniodes rubialalis is a moth in the family Crambidae. It was described by Paul Dognin in 1897. It is found in the eastern Andes from Bolivia to Ecuador, as well as in Costa Rica.

The length of the forewings is 11–15 mm for males and 12–14 mm for females. The forewings are orange with a black antemedial line. The hindwings are pale yellow with brown marginal band on the extreme margin. Adults have been recorded on wing in January, from March to May and in August, September, November and December.

References

Moths described in 1897
Eurrhypini